Rajabagan is a neighbourhood located in the south-western part of Kolkata city, in the state of West Bengal, India. It is located on the eastern bank of Hooghly river and is situated between Metiabruz (east) and Badartala (west).

Geography

Post Office
The Post Office of the area is named 'Rajabagan Dock Yard' with the Pin code 700044.

Police district
Rajabagan police station is part of the Port division of Kolkata Police. It is located at T-250 Garden Reach Road, Kolkata-700044.

Watgunge Women police station, located at 16, Watgunge Street, Kolkata-700023, covers all police districts under the jurisdiction of the Port division i.e. North Port, South Port, Watgunge, West Port, Garden Reach, Ekbalpur, Nadial, Rajabagan and Metiabruz.

Jadavpur, Thakurpukur, Behala, Purba Jadavpur, Tiljala, Regent Park, Metiabruz, Nadial and Kasba police stations were transferred from South 24 Parganas to Kolkata in 2011. Except Metiabruz, all the police stations were split into two. The new police stations are Parnasree, Haridevpur, Garfa, Patuli, Survey Park, Pragati Maidan, Bansdroni and Rajabagan.

Economy
 Rajabagan Dockyard

References

See also

Neighbourhoods in Kolkata